Buzz McCoy (born Marston Daley) is one of the founding members of industrial disco band My Life with the Thrill Kill Kult.

History
Buzz McCoy and friend Groovie Mann (Frankie Nardiello) had been working together on a film titled Hammerhead Housewife and the Thrill Kill Kult in 1987.  The film was never finished, but the title inspired the name of their new band, and its soundtrack was released as an EP with Wax Trax! Records.

In 1991, McCoy collaborated with KMFDM founder Sascha Konietzko to work on another musical project, Excessive Force.  They released one album before parting ways, though Konietzko went on to release another album without McCoy.

In 2001, McCoy and Mann formed SleazeBox Records as a vehicle for their side projects. McCoy co-wrote and produced the 2002 album Chemical Messiah by Cherrie Blue (Ruth MacArdle a.k.a. Lady Galore of the Belgian new beat pioneers Lords Of Acid). He wrote and produced the 2012 album A Taste 4 Trouble by the Bomb Gang Girlz (the back-up group of female singers for the My Life with the Thrill Kill Kult). He also released his first solo album, Moda X, in 2017.

References

External links
 My Life with the Thrill Kill Kult official site

American industrial musicians
American record producers
Living people
Year of birth missing (living people)
Berklee College of Music alumni
Place of birth missing (living people)
My Life with the Thrill Kill Kult members
Excessive Force members
Pigface members